Đồng Khởi Street (Vietnamese: Đường Đồng Khởi), formerly known as Rue Catinat and Tự Do Street, is a street in District 1, Ho Chi Minh City.

History
The street was originally named after the French Warship Catinat that participated in the mid-19th century attacks by France when that country was intent on seizing control of Viet Nam. The ship itself honored Nicolas Catinat, a 17th and 18th century Marshal of France; but application of name to prominent street was intended to remind strollers of the first step toward control of a vanquished nation by a colonial power Before its present incarnation as Đồng Khởi visitors to Saigon will remember Tự Do Street, as it was called by the Vietnamese after the French departed.

Đường Đồng Khởi is the location of a number of famous colonial buildings:
 Hotel Continental, the old foreign journalists' hang-out. Restored somewhat earlier than the other hotels, it has a more Vietnamese feel and is cheaper.  The outdoor bar is gone, but the lobby one is furnished in rattan.
 Hotel Majestic, located where the street meets the Saigon River. Built in 1925, with a central courtyard and a roof bar.  French restoration, French prices.
 Grand Hotel, on the next corner in from the Majestic.  A very French restoration—cream stucco and white marble dark mahogany, liveried attendants.  The original building, the home of Fowler and Phuong in The Quiet American may be seen among the photos in Norman Sherry's biography of the author.
 Palais Cafe, a bar, also renovated.

Notes and references

See also
Nguyễn Huệ Street

Geography of Ho Chi Minh City
Streets in Ho Chi Minh City